Rindborg is a Swedish surname. Notable people with the surname include:

Ingvar Rindborg (1931–2016), Swedish banker, brother of Stig
Stig Rindborg (1929–2018), Swedish politician and lawyer

Swedish-language surnames